Lists of Romanian monarchs include:

List of rulers of Wallachia (1290–1862)
List of rulers of Moldavia (1347–1862)
Domnitori (1862–1881)
King of Romania (1881–1947)

See also
 List of heads of state of Romania